Nathan A. Moore is a US Coast Guard Rear Admiral and commander of the Seventeenth Coast Guard District.

Early life and education 
Moore graduated from Gadsden High School in 1988. He attended the United States Coast Guard Academy, where he was a member of Alfa Company. He graduated in 1992 with a Bachelor of Science in Naval Architecture and Marine Engineering. He later attended the University of Michigan, where he earned a Master's of Naval Architecture in Marine Engineering and an MBA. He also attended the Dwight D. Eisenhower School for National Security and Resource Strategy, graduating with a Master's in National Resource Strategy.

Military service 
Moore served as an engineer and a cutterman, serving aboard the USCGC Polar Star as a student. After graduation, he served on the USCGC Harriet Lane as an Engineer Officer and on the USCGC Venturous as the Executive Officer. He commanded two ships: the USCGC Resolute and the USCGC Stratton.

As a staff officer, Moore served at the Navy Surface Warfare Officer School as a ship stability instructor, commanded Naval Engineering Support Unit Honolulu, was Chief of the Officer Assignment Branch at Personnel Services Center, and was Chief of the office of Naval Engineering at Coast Guard Headquarters.

From 2017 to 2019, Moore was the Deputy Commander and Chief of Staff of Coast Guard Pacific Area. From 2019 to 2021, he was the Assistant  Commandant for Engineering and Logistics. While serving in the latter position, he testified to the House Coast Guard & Maritime Transportation Subcommittee (under the United States House Committee on Transportation and Infrastructure) about Coast Guard Infrastructure.

On April 23, 2021, Moore took command of the Seventeenth Coast Guard District. He replaced the outgoing commander, Rear Admiral Matthew T. Bell, who had previously voiced his support for Moore's command.

Awards and Commendations 

 Legion of Merit (one star)
 Meritorious Service Medal (three stars)
 Coast Guard Commendation Medal (one star)
 Navy Commendation Medal

Personal life 
His parents are Nate and Judy Moore.

References 

Living people
People from Gadsden, Alabama
Military personnel from Alabama
Recipients of the Legion of Merit
United States Coast Guard Academy alumni
United States Coast Guard admirals
University of Michigan alumni
Dwight D. Eisenhower School for National Security and Resource Strategy alumni
Recipients of the Meritorious Service Medal (United States)
Year of birth missing (living people)